Pandit Shripad Hegde is an Indian music composer and Hindustani classical vocalist (born on 1 January 1957) from Kampli, Uttara Kannada District. He has been on the staff of All India Radio, Dharwad, since 1987.

Early life 
Hedge was born into a family with a background of Yakshagana heritage, and was attracted to music at a young age. He started training in Hindustani music in his teens, under Pandit Ganapati Bhat. In 1982, Hegde moved to Dharwad to devote himself fully to music. Pt Basavaraj Rajguru, a Kirana Gharana vocalist, mentored Hedge for a decade.

Career 
Hegde developed his style involving the nuances of both Gwalior Gharana and Kirana Gharana. Like his mentor, he is eclectic and blends aesthetic subtleties of other singing schools into his style.

Though Khyal is his forte, he is equally adept in singing light classical pieces. His recitals are regularly broadcast from AIR Dharwad. He has featured in the Sunday night concert of AIR.

Hegde has organised music concerts, including Alladiyakhan Punya Samaroh Mumbai, Karnataka Sangha Mumbai, Deenath Mangeshkar Punyatithi. Goa, Mugubai Kurdikar Punyatithi Goa, Dasara Festival Mysore, Sitar Ratna Music Festival Dharwad, Art Circle Golden Kubilee conference Hubli, Dharwad Utsav, Kundgol ustav, Purandarotsava Hampi, Hindustani Kalakar Mandali Bengaluru, Rajguru Sangeeta Pratistan Bengaluru, and Puttaraj Gavayi Jayanti Utsav.

Composer

Hegde is also known for his compositions, such as "Shruti Sanjeevini", "Divya Sannidi", "Prema Sangama", and "Vachana Vaibhava" in light music. He also released classical CDs, Parampara and Rageshri.

He received many accolades over the course of his career, including first place at AIR national level for the composition of "Megha medini", a sangeeta rupaka, and first place at state level for the composition of "Garudamruta".

Teacher

Hegde followed the noble tradition of teaching and is considered to be a Guru. He gave many workshops and lectures on music through Karnataka Sangeeta Nritya academy.

Recognition
Hegde is the recipient of many honours and awards:

 Karnataka Kalashri by Karnataka Sangeeta Nritya Academy and Department of Kannada and Culture
 Aryabhata by Aryabhata cultural organisation of Bengaluru
 Ragaratna
 Chandrahasa
 Gaan Govind
 Gaana Gandharva

References

Sources

External links

Categories

1957 births
Hindustani singers
Kannada people
People from Uttara Kannada
20th-century Indian male classical singers
Kirana gharana
Living people
Singers from Karnataka
21st-century Indian male classical singers